Thiorhodococcus mannitoliphagus is a bacterium from the genus of Thiorhodococcus which has been isolated from a microbial mat from the White Sea.

References 

Chromatiales
Bacteria described in 2006